Lan Mei-chin (born 7 September 1944) is a Taiwanese politician. She was elected to the Taipei City Council for the first time in 1985 and served until 2002, when she took office as a member of the Legislative Yuan, where she served until 2008.

Political career
Lan served four terms on the Taipei City Council from 1985 to 2002. She formed an electoral coalition with Shen Fu-hsiung, Tuan Yi-kang, Chou Po-ya, and Julian Kuo in 2001, and won election to the Legislative Yuan. Lan joined the same alliance, which had replaced Chou with Wang Shih-chien, for her 2004 reelection bid.

Personal life
Lan is married to Huang Tien-fu, the younger brother of Huang Hsin-chieh. Their youngest son, has served on the Taipei City Council. Huang Hsin-yi, their youngest child, hung herself in October 2004 in the home she shared with her eldest brother's family. Lan's brother, was also a member of the Taipei City Council and Taipei's Department of Civil Affairs director.

References

1944 births
Living people
21st-century Taiwanese women politicians
Members of the 5th Legislative Yuan
Members of the 6th Legislative Yuan
Democratic Progressive Party Members of the Legislative Yuan
Taipei Members of the Legislative Yuan
20th-century Taiwanese women politicians
Taipei City Councilors
Women local politicians in Taiwan
20th-century Taiwanese politicians
Spouses of Taiwanese politicians